HTV7 is a entertainment sociocultural TV channel in Vietnam, broadcast by Ho Chi Minh City Television since 1987.

History of formation and development 
 Before January 27, 1973, this was the channel serving the US Army stationed in Southern Vietnam with the name AFVN, broadcasting on the 11 VHF band.
 From January 27, 1973, AFVN channel stopped broadcasting.
 From April 30, 1975, the Liberation Army took over all materials and headquarters of Radio Saigon, changing the station's name to Liberation Radio Television to broadcast information about the head and cabinet of the Government of the Republic of Vietnam has fallen.
 In 1986, channel HTV7 was broadcast experimentally with the entire duration allowed to continue HTV9 channel to serve color system conversion (at this time channel HTV7 (R7 VHF) was broadcasting PAL, HTV9 (R9 VHF) was broadcasting.  NTSC ). Searching the following month, HTV7 spent more time on classifieds, advertising and advertising programs. Channel 7 was tested as a Service Channel – Public Information of Ho Chi Minh City Television.
1987: Channel 7 officially broadcast.
 1990: Channel 7 raised the total broadcast time to 12 hours/day, (in the early 1990s it was broadcast with HTV9 in the morning.)
 1994: Channel 7 changed its name to HTV7.
 1995: HTV7 increased the total broadcasting time to 14h/day, from 6:00 am to 12:00 pm, 5:00 pm to 0:00 am on channel 7 VHF in Ho Chi Minh City.  At the same time, the HTV7 logo appears in the color R-G-B. 
 May 1999: HTV7 started broadcasting live program Bridge music, opening a series of live programs music on TV  .
 December 31, 1999: Together with HTV9, broadcast a special program to welcome the new millennium with a record longest length of time at that time in Vietnam to welcome the new year.  2000.
 2000s: HTV7 broadcasts from 05h30 to 24h00 daily, broadcasts 2 episodes/day of feature films.
 Since 2003, HTV7 changed its new identity.  In December of the same year, HTV7 also officially broadcast on the terrestrial digital DVB-T system of HTV, VTC, BTV... At the same time, HTV7 channel is also broadcast analog at Dien Bien, Lam Dong, Hai Phong and some other provinces and cities nationwide.
 May 19, 2005: HTV7 broadcasts "Vietnamese Film Golden Hour" at 21:00 every day from Thursday to Sunday, starting from the movie "Love spiral", from 2012 to 20:00 and extending the time from 2012 to 20:00.  broadcast every day.
 2005: HTV7 and HTV9 are broadcast on Measat satellite.
 June 1, 2005: HTV7 is broadcast 23.5/24h daily.
 June 1, 2008: Officially opening the golden time frame for Gameshow/talkshow at 6:10 p.m. daily.
 Mid-May – Early June 2008: HTV7 launched 2 new news programs: Yesterday's World and 24 Hour World, creating a breakthrough in the newssocial on HTV7.
 June 2008: Broadcast HTV7 high definition HDTV channel on HDTV system of HTVC.
 July 2008: HTV7 is broadcast on Vinasat 1 satellite transmitted by HTV.
 January 1, 2012: The evening program 60 Seconds was released and broadcast with HTV9.  Next, "Vietnamese Film Golden Hour" is postponed to 20:05 from Sunday to Thursday.
 Early 2013: Vietnamese Film Golden Hour is added to the time frame at 22:45 from Monday to Friday, mainly replaying old movies that were broadcast on HTV.
 May 19, 2013: HTV7 is broadcast in HD standard.
 October 10, 2014: HTV7 is broadcast on DVB-T2 digital terrestrial digital system on 33 UHF frequency with HD standard along with HTV9
 January 1, 2016: HTV7 broadcasts in the aspect ratio 16:9, HD 1080i, and at the same time changes its appearance.
 June 15, 2016: Stop broadcasting channel HTV7 on analog terrestrial television system.
 October 1, 2016: Upgrading the quality and renewing program content on channel HTV7.
 2018: Broadcasting in HD on television digital terrestrial system DVB-T2 of VTC on channel 31.
 March 1, 2023, the HD logo of channels HTV7 along with channel HTV9 has officially disappeared. From here on, the SD and HD streams of the official channel are merged

Broadcast duration 
 April 30, 1986 – December 31, 1989: 18h00 – 24h00
 Early 1990s: morning content with HTV9, from 18:00 to 24:00 is separate content:
 1992 – 1995: 06h00 – 12h00 (replay), 18h00 – 24h00 (main broadcast).
 1995 – December 31, 1997: 06:00 – 12:00, 17:00 – 24:00
 1998 – earlys 2000s: 05:30 – 13:00, 14h00 – 24h00 
 early 2000s  – 2005: 05h30 – 24h00
 January 1, 2005 – now: 05h00 – 04h30

Featured programs

Present
General
60 seconds (06:30 am, 06:30 pm GMT+7)
Chuyen trưa 12 gio: 12:00am GMT+7
Sitcom, Drama movies (Korea, China, Taiwan, Hongkong, India...), Vietnamese Movies (7.30pm Mon-Wed)
Tạp chí văn nghệ
Other programmes 
Monday:
100%
Bạn muốn hẹn hò 
Người lạ hiểu lòng tôi
Tuesday
Ngạc nhiên chưa – Password
Người đẹp nhân ái
Hay hay hên
Wednesday
Quýt làm cam chịu
Mái ấm gia đình Việt
Khi ta 20
Thursday (Weekend)
Thực khách vui vẻ
Gõ cửa thăm nhà
Mẹ chồng nàng dâu
Biển của hy vọng - Hope of Sea
Trai xinh gái đẹp
Kỳ nghỉ giữa tuần
Friday (Weekend)
12 con giáp 8 chuyện thiên hạ
Tiếng rao 4.0
Ký ức bất ngờ
Sao nhập ngũ
Người Việt bốn phương 
Saturday (Weekend)
Phụ nữ và hội nhập (2 month/times)
Cầu nối yêu thương
Bác sĩ ơi, tại sao
Ranh giới trắng đen
Tình trăm năm
Bạn muốn hẹn hò
Quán ăn hạnh phúc
Uớc mơ bốn bể là nhà
Khi vợ vắng nhà
Nhanh như chớp – Lightning Quiz
Đập hộp kén rể
Sunday (Weekend)
Box thư giãn
Xe và xu hướng
Doctor 365
Bếp nhà mình
Lệnh truy nã
Hẹn hò cùng ngôi sao 
Biệt đội phấn trắng 
Hòa bình gọi
Alo MR Cảnh báo
Sống khỏe đời vui
Bác sĩ nhi khoa
Hỏi bác sĩ chuyên khoa
Chinh phục thực khách
Không gian cảm xúc
Chọn ai đây? - Hollywood Square
Vợ chồng son – Shinkon-san Irasshai
Chiến thắng cùng con
Studio #H9 – Hẹn cuối tuần

Before
Chung sức – Family Feud
Nhanh như chớp – Lightning quiz
Quý ông hoàn hảo – Mister Prefect
Giọng ải giọng ai – a spin-off programme that officially recognised as part of I Can See Your Voice franchise, also the Vietnamese version
Mặt nạ ngôi sao – King Of Mask Singer
Series Perfect Dating: Vì yêu mà đến, Tỏ tình hoàn mỹ, Tình yêu hoàn mỹ
Hát mãi ước mơ
Thách thức danh hài – Crack Them Up
Người bí ẩn – Odd One In
Đi tìm ẩn số – Deal or no Deal
Thử tài thách trí – Gra W Ciemno
Người đứng vững – Still Standing
Kỳ tài thách đấu – Wow Wow Wow
Thiên đường ẩm thực  
Rock Việt
Và tôi vẫn hát 
Nào ta cùng hát

See also
Ho Chi Minh City Television
HTV9
List of television programmes broadcast by HTV

References

Television stations in Vietnam
1987 establishments in Vietnam